Merrill Henry "Doc" Williams (26 October 1912 Indianapolis, Indiana – 28 April 1982 Richmond, Indiana) was an American racecar driver.

Williams attempted to qualify for the Indianapolis 500 every year from 1933 to 1941 but only succeeded in qualifying in 1936, 1940, and 1941. When the race returned in 1946 after World War II, Williams again failed to qualify. In 1947 he qualified a Novi powered Kurtis but it was driven by Herb Ardinger, who finished 4th, completing all 200 laps. He qualified again in 1948 but was knocked out of the race after 19 laps. He failed to qualify in 1949 and it was the end of his Champ Car career. Williams did not attempt to qualify for any Championship Car races other than the Indy 500.

Indy 500 results

References

1912 births
1982 deaths
Indianapolis 500 drivers
Sportspeople from Richmond, Indiana
Racing drivers from Indianapolis